Metapenaeopsis kishinouyei is a species of prawn in the genus Metapenaeopsis, the velvet shrimps. The specific epithet is a tribute to the Japanese fisheries biologist Kamakichi Kishinouye (岸上 鎌吉, 1867–1929).

References

Penaeidae
Crustaceans described in 1902
Taxa named by Mary J. Rathbun